The Oracle Exadata Database Machine (Exadata) is a computing platform optimized for running Oracle Databases.

Exadata is a combined hardware and software platform that includes scale-out x86-64 compute and storage servers, RoCE or InfiniBand networking, RDMA-addressable memory acceleration, NVMe flash, and specialized software.

Exadata was introduced in 2008 for on-premises deployment, and, since October 2015, via the Oracle Cloud as a subscription service, known as the Exadata Database Service. Exadata Cloud@Customer is an on-premises implementation of Exadata Database Service, available since 2017. Oracle databases deployed in the Exadata Database Service or Exadata Cloud@Customer are 100% compatible with databases deployed on Exadata on-premises, enabling customers to transition to the Oracle Cloud with no application changes. Oracle Corporation manages this service, including hardware, network, Linux software and Exadata software, while customers have complete ownership of their databases.

Use cases
Exadata is designed to run Oracle Database workloads, such as an OLTP application running simultaneously with Analytics processing. Historically, specialized database computing platforms were designed for a particular workload, such as Data Warehousing, and poor or unusable for other workloads, such as OLTP. Exadata allows mixed workloads to share system resources fairly with resource management features allowing prioritized allocation, such as always favoring workloads servicing interactive users over reporting and batch, even if they are accessing the same data. Long running requests, characterized by Data Warehouses, reports, batch jobs and Analytics, are reputed to run many times faster compared to a conventional, non-Exadata database server.

Release History

End-of-support
As the platform has been around since 2008, Oracle has published information related to the end-of-support for older Exadata generations. In Oracle's published document titled Oracle Hardware and
Systems Support Policies, they mention "After five years from last ship date, replacement parts may not be available and/or the response times for sending replacement parts may be delayed." To look up the "last ship date" of a particular Oracle Exadata generation, Oracle published a document titled Oracle Exadata - A guide for decision makers.

References

External links

 Oracle Website: Oracle Exadata Database Machine

Database management systems
Data warehousing products
Exadata